Marein is a chalconoid, a type of natural phenol. It is the 4'-O-glucoside of okanin. It can be found in Coreopsis maritima. It is an anthochlor pigment, a kind of yellow pigment.

References

External links 
 Marein spectral data on www.massbank.jp

Chalconoid glucosides